Claire Allan Dinsmore (born 1961) is an American jeweller, designer and new media artist. Dinsmore was born in Princeton, New Jersey in 1961. She began her artistic career as a jewellery artist, moving later to net art and hypertext. Her work is included in the collections of the Smithsonian American Art Museum and the Museum of Fine Arts Houston.

Claire Dinsmore founded and published Cauldron & Net, a collection of electronic literature, from 1997 to 2002. These files are now being served on the NeXt, an online digital repository and museum sponsored by the University of Washington.

References

1961 births
Living people
21st-century American women artists
20th-century American women artists
American jewellers
New media artists
People from Princeton, New Jersey
Women jewellers
American publishers (people)
Electronic literature writers